Rafael Campos (born April 15, 1988) is a Puerto Rican professional golfer who currently plays on the PGA Tour.

Early life
Campos was born in San Juan, Puerto Rico and started playing golf at age 9.

Professional career
Campos turned professional in 2011 and the following year finished third on the Tour de las Américas Order of Merit. In 2015 he finished third on the PGA Tour Latinoamérica Order of Merit, allowing him to become a Web.com Tour member in 2016. He finished 111th on the Web.com Tour money list in 2016 and did not retain membership.

In March 2017, playing on a sponsor exemption, he tied for 10th at the Puerto Rico Open on the PGA Tour. This allowed him to compete in the following week's Shell Houston Open, where he finished 7th. In May he played the Web.com Tour's Corales Puntacana Resort and Club Championship on a sponsor exemption and tied for third; a tie for 11th at the following event gave him Special Temporary Membership on the Web.com Tour, and he finished the season 57th on the money list, giving him full membership for 2018.

In 2018, Campos finished runner-up at the Panama Championship, 2 shots behind Scott Langley.

In January 2019, Campos claimed his first professional victory at The Bahamas Great Abaco Classic on the Web.com Tour. He was the first Puerto Rican to win on the Web.com Tour. He finished 18th on the regular-season points list and earned a PGA Tour card for the 2019–20 season. 

Campos played in nine events on the PGA Tour in 2019–20 before a back injury caused him to miss the rest of the season (including missing the Puerto Rico Open for the first time since its inception in 2008). Due to the adjustments to PGA Tour eligibility as a result of the COVID-19 pandemic, he was able to retain membership in 2020–21 without having to rely on a medical extension.

In February 2021, Campos recorded his best finish on the PGA Tour with a tie for 3rd at the Puerto Rico Open. He had held a share of the lead after 54 holes. A few weeks later, Campos was in contention to win again at the Corales Puntacana Resort and Club Championship. He eventually finished tied for 2nd, one shot behind Joel Dahmen.

Professional wins (1)

Korn Ferry Tour wins (1)

See also
2019 Korn Ferry Tour Finals graduates

References

External links

Puerto Rican male golfers
PGA Tour golfers
Olympic golfers of Puerto Rico
Golfers at the 2020 Summer Olympics
Korn Ferry Tour graduates
Sportspeople from San Juan, Puerto Rico
1988 births
Living people